Suprema are elements in order theory.

Suprema may also refer to:

 Suprema (comics), a fictional superheroine

See also
 Supreme (disambiguation)
 Supremo (disambiguation)